XHMPM-FM is a Spanish-language Top 40 radio station located in San Blas, Sinaloa, serving Los Mochis. It broadcasts on 98.9 MHz on FM from a tower located on Cerro La Memoria in Los Mochis.

History
On November 2, 1980, Radio Topolobampo, S.A. signed on XEIF-AM on 1240 kHz, with transmitter located at Charay, Sinaloa. XEIF changed calls twice: to XEREY-AM, matching its name as Radio Reyna, and then by 1994 to XEMPM-AM, now on 1030 kHz, known as Radio Fama.

In 2010, the station changed its name to La Pesada with a Regional Mexican format and local news. On November 3, of that same year, XEMPM was authorized to migrate to FM, and XHMPM-FM 98.9 came to air at the end of January 2011.

After the failure of La Pesada, Radiosistema del Noroeste affiliated with MVS Radio to launch its Exa FM format in Los Mochis, effective May 14, 2011.

References

External links
 Exa FM Website
 RSN Website

Radio stations in Sinaloa
Radio stations established in 1980
Spanish-language radio stations
Contemporary hit radio stations in Mexico
Mass media in Los Mochis